Lee Bergere (born Solomon Bergelson; April 10, 1918 – January 31, 2007) was an American actor, known for his role as Joseph Anders in the 1980s television series Dynasty.

Stage
Born in Brooklyn, New York, Bergere began his career in 1936 at age 18 as Danny Kaye's understudy in the Broadway production of Lady in the Dark. He appeared as the Duke, with Richard Kiley reprising his role as Don Quixote, when the Broadway hit Man of La Mancha premiered in Los Angeles in 1967. Through the years, Bergere also played Quixote as well as other characters in the show in Los Angeles, San Francisco and New York. His Broadway credits also include Happiness Is Just a Little Thing Called a Rolls Royce, and Right Next to Broadway.

Television

Bergere debuted on television on an episode of the live series Studio One with James Dean. He made three guest appearances on Perry Mason, two in 1963. In "The Case of the Witless Witness" he portrayed James Wall, a Congressional committee examiner. Later that year he played Dr. Charles Nevin, brother-in-law of convicted murderer Janice Barton, in the episode, "The Case of the Deadly Verdict". He also made one appearance as French psychiatrist Francois Chalon in The Addams Family. In 1964 he played Ramon in the Munsters TV show. In 1965 he portrayed Dr. George Devlin in "The Case of the Murderous Mermaid".

Bergere played Abraham Lincoln, in the Star Trek episode "The Savage Curtain". Other parts included comedic guest-star roles on Kentucky Jones, Get Smart, My Favorite Martian, The Munsters, All in the Family, WKRP in Cincinnati (in a pig costume), and a starring role on the short-lived series Hot l Baltimore, on which he played one of TV's first gay regular characters. During the first season of Mission: Impossible, Bergere played the character of a Swiss banker in the episode entitled "The Legacy". Bergere played German Count Von Sichel on Hogan's Heroes in the 1966 episode "The Prince From the Phone Company".

Bergere was known for his haughty and superior characters, a typecasting that culminated in his selection as the majordomo Joseph Anders on the prime-time soap opera Dynasty. With that role, and his on-screen billing in the show's opening credits starting in season two, Bergere achieved a level of fame rarely matched by other character actors who, like him, had worked in relative anonymity as guest stars on television series in the 1960s and 1970s including Hogan's Heroes. He appeared regularly only during the first three seasons of Dynasty (returning briefly in the fourth to be "killed off"), but his role grew beyond opening doors and announcing guests to encompass storylines that included the introduction of a daughter and his own character's suicide after setting a cliff-hanging fire.

His last role was a recurring part on three episodes of Falcon Crest, another popular 1980s night-time soap.

Military service 
A veteran of World War II, Bergere supervised entertainment services for soldiers stationed in North Africa.

Death 
Bergere died, aged 88, from undisclosed causes in Colonial Poplin Nursing and Rehabilitation Facility in Fremont, New Hampshire, where he had taken up residence some years earlier, having left the acting profession in 1989. He was survived by one daughter, Mimi, and one grandson, and a nephew.

Filmography

References

External links
 
 
 Photo of Lee Bergere by Mimi Bergere

1918 births
2007 deaths
American male soap opera actors
American male television actors
People from Brooklyn
People from Rockingham County, New Hampshire
20th-century American male actors